Wildland fire and wildland fire atmospheric emissions have been a part of the global biosphere for millennia. The major wildland fire emissions include greenhouse gases and several criteria pollutants that impact human health and welfare.:

Compared to the preindustrial era, wildland land fire in the conterminous U.S. has been reduced 90 percent with proportional reductions in wildland fire emissions. Land use changes (agriculture and urbanization) are responsible for roughly 50 percent of this decrease, and land management decisions (land fragmentation, suppression actions, etc.) are responsible for the remainder. Anthropogenic activities (e.g., industrial production, transportation, agriculture, etc.) today have more than replaced the lost preindustrial wildland fire atmospheric emissions.

The following charts compare preindustrial wildland fire emissions  with contemporary emissions.

In addition to greenhouse gas emissions, particulates and smoke released can scatter or absorb solar radiation and be deposited elsewhere where they may affect albedo particularly if landing on snow or glaciers.

References

Wildfires
Climate forcing
Air pollution